KJAM-FM (103.1 FM, "Jammin' Country") is a full-service radio station licensed to serve Madison, South Dakota. The station is owned by Alpha Media, through licensee Digity 3E License, LLC. It airs a country music format.

Notable on-air personalities include Peg Nordling, JJ, Paul Vold, and the syndicated hosts Whitney Allen and Lia.

KJAM-FM is also the home for area high school football and basketball broadcasts, as well as Dakota State University. During the summer, KJAM-FM also broadcasts amateur baseball games from the Corn Belt League.

The station was assigned the KJAM-FM call letters by the Federal Communications Commission on November 29, 1979.

References

External links
KJAM-FM official website

JAM-FM
Country radio stations in the United States
Lake County, South Dakota
Alpha Media radio stations